Jhulelal Institute of Technology (JIT) is an engineering and management college established in 2008 is named after the community God of Sindhi people-Jhulelal (Sindhi/Urdu: جهوللال), (Sanskrit: झूलेलाल) or Dariyalal.

The institute is affiliated with the Rashtrasant Tukadoji Maharaj Nagpur University and approved by the All India Council for Technical Education (AICTE). 

JIT offers undergraduate and postgraduate programs in various engineering disciplines such as computer science, electronics and telecommunication, mechanical engineering, civil engineering, and electrical engineering. The institute also offers a master's degree in business administration (MBA) and a diploma in mechanical engineering.

The faculty at JIT comprises highly qualified and experienced professors who impart education through a combination of lectures, practical sessions, and interactive sessions. The institute provides a conducive learning environment that encourages students to excel in academics and extracurricular activities.

JIT has state-of-the-art infrastructure with well-equipped laboratories, libraries, computer centers, and sports facilities. The institute also has a dedicated placement cell that helps students to secure employment in leading companies through campus recruitment drives.

JIT is committed to providing quality education to its students and preparing them to become successful engineers and business professionals. It has consistently been ranked among the top engineering colleges in Maharashtra and has a strong alumni network spread across the world.

Campus
The campus is divided into two buildings. The academic area chiefly comprises the main building and another building where the auditorium is located.

The institute has basketball, volleyball and badminton courts. It also has an indoor games facility for students, where they play table tennis, carrom, chess and cards.

Campus area:	
Location
 from zero mile, Nagpur
 from Nagpur Railway Station 
 from Dr. Babasaheb Ambedkar International Airport, Nagpur

Inauguration of the college building
On 29 September 2012, the JIT college building was inaugurated with the hands of BJP National President Nitinji Gadkari. MLA Vikas Kumbhare, NMC Standing Committee Chairman Dayashankar Tiwari, MLA Vijay Ghodmare, MLA Chandrashekhar Bawankhule, Devendra Fadnavis, Sunil Kedar, and Mayor Anil Sole were also present as guests.

Academics 
The institute offers Bachelor of Engineering (BE) courses in various disciplines, with a total intake of 390 students per annum on the first year and 78 on the second. The institute also offers a Master of Business Administration (MBA) course with 60 seats per annum.

Cultural and non-academic activities

Technical activities

Shikhar technology festival

A national level tech-fest, "Shikhar", is conducted every year. Thousands of students from engineering and management colleges across India participate. It is organized at JIT campus under the aegis of ISTE, JIT Students Chapter. Around 1000 students from 36 engineering colleges from Pune and Tamil Nadu, Andhra Pradesh Universities along with students from Chandrapur, Wardha, Gondia and Yavatmal districts engineering colleges participate.   It is a technical event with various competitions like C-coding, web design, project exhibition, Robo-Race, Line Follower, Wall Follower and LAN gaming are held.

A total of 179 technical papers were presented by students in parallel sessions. Projects were also displayed. Participants from various branches such as electronics, electrical, computer science, IT, mechanical, civil and MBA participated. Around 200 students along with their robots took part.

Workshop on Aptitude Development (WAD) 
The workshop consists of technical sessions by experts along with the interactive and participative sessions for the students on various topics including:
1. Analytical ability
2. English Language
3. Aptitude building
4. Group discussion techniques
5. Public speaking
6. Personal interview techniques
7. Logical thinking and reasoning

A principals' discussion  panel on "Personality Development in Technical Education" was organized in WAD, emphasing the importance of being focused. Students were given valuable input and were evaluated for their performance in social skills by eminent panelists during WAD.

In 2012, Mr. Anil Malviya, senate member, RTMNU was the guest of honor of the function. WAD-DIP Dr. Vilas Sapkal, Vice Chancellor of Rashtrasant Tukdoji Maharaj Nagpur University (RTMNU) gave an address about career opportunities and students' options after graduation. He also talked about the new developments in Nagpur University which will be beneficial for the students. He answered queries regarding thesyllabus, fees structure and time taken for services provided by the university.

Jallosh culture festival
JIT-Jallosh is an annual culture festival organized every year by the college. Cultural activities like singing, dancing, rangoli, art, quiz, debate, and personality also mark an important feature in the life of a student. Singing and dancing have always been very popular with JIT students. JITians actively participate in quiz and debate activities.

JIT-Jallosh includes events like "BRAIN BOX" (a general quiz competition) and the RUPAK singing competition. The next event was ICON, a student personality competition for the male and female icons of JIT. WORD WAR is a debate competition, followed by Sur-Sangram-antakshari. JIT-JALLOSH ended with the THIRKAN dance competition.

Mythbusters - Talent and Beyond 
This was a five-day mega youth event organised by JIT students (Anurag Deshpande, Anup N Nair, Nikhil Vanjani, Esha Ghosh, Sanket S Parma, Shashwath Kamath and Abhijeet Shiwankar). Around 800 students from about 60 colleges in and around Nagpur participated in this event. The event took place at various locations around Nagpur. The event tested the students on various aspects such as team-building, social, mental, and physical skills.

Social activities

National Service Scheme

The National Service Scheme (NSS), under the Ministry of Youth Affairs and Sports Government of India,  was launched in Gandhiji's centenary birth year of 1969, in 37 universities involving 40,000 students with a primary focus on the development of students' personality through community service.

JIT have a very active NSS unit. This helps the students to grow as responsible citizens and also enjoy the pleasure of giving.

Activities taken by National Service Scheme:
Blood donation camp for students and staff
Stationary distribution to Prathamik Shala children in Lonara village
Old garment distribution to poor and needy people in Lonara and Gumthala villages
Polio awareness program
Nail cutter distribution and health check-up camp in villages
Awareness of healthy habits / gram Swachchhata Abhiyan at Lonara or Gumtala
Annadan donation program at deaf and dumb/disabled children school in Saoner
Fruit distribution program in old age home on Hingna Road
Ganeshotsav celebration at JIT
Tree planting programme

Rotaract Club

An installation ceremony of the Rotaract Club of Nagpur took place in JIT on 15 August 2009 by the hands of Shri Sanjay Meshram, the chief guest of the function. The Rotaract Club comes under Rotary Club, Nagpur, Ishanya. Shri Kamal Taori, Director of Youth Services; Rtn Naresh Jain, President Nagpur – Ishanya; Shri. Pramod Pampatwar, Secretary of Rotary Club, Nagpur; Shri Mahesh Sadhwani, Chairman SSCT; Dr. S.V. Gole, Vice-principal JIT; Shri Virendra Kukreja, and Secretary SSCT graced the function with their presence. The installation was followed by tree planting.

Polio awareness camp: The NSS department of JIT and the Rotaract Club of Nagpur arranged a camp for spreading awareness regarding one of the deadliest diseases, polio. About 40 members together assembled on JIT grounds and then proceeded to nearby villages. The members divided themselves into groups of five and then worked for a noble cause encouraging the villagers of Gumthala and Lonara village near JIT to take their children for polio drops.

Teaching Campaign: The Rotaract Club of JIThad organized a teaching campaign at Bokahara. The students of class I-VII grades had a fun-filled learning experience with the members. The two-hour teaching session ended with the distribution of biscuits and sweets.  The campaign involved twenty Rotaract members of JIT.

In Rotaract Club, students were taught about personality development, time management and leadership skills.

Student Association

Zeal - department electronics and telecommunications

A state level mini project competition "Rhapsodize" was organised at JIT on 1 March 2011 by CS/IT and ETC departments under the forum Encyphrist and Zeal. Students from various colleges participated in the events. The event was held in the computer center of the college. Prizes were distributed.

Sports

Department of Physical Education
The main objective of the Department of Physical Education is to develop overall the personality of the student by cultivating social habits through NSS and Rotaract. The department has indoor and outdoor sports facilities. This year JIT students participated in various sports organized by RTM Nagpur University and showed remarkable performance as compared to other new colleges.

It is aptly said that college is not only about paper qualifications but the overall development of an individual to emerge as leaders of tomorrow with strong character. Believing this, the department of physical education has given its students a platform to exhibit their skills. The aim of the department is to get maximum participation from the students and make the students aware of competitions. The year 2101-2011 saw a phenomenal rise in the activities in college in terms of both quality and volume.

As per the university calendar, the teams for various events are selected through an inter-section intra mural jallosh cup matches. Games in which Jitians participated at university level are as follows:
Chess (men)
Chess (women)
Basketball (men)
Basketball (women)
Volleyball (men)
Volleyball (women)
Badminton (men)
Badminton (women)
Cricket (men)
Softball
Korfball
Table tennis (men)
Table tennis (women)
Athletics

See also
 List of universities in India
 Universities and colleges in India
 Education in India
 Distance Education Council
 University Grants Commission (India)

References

External links 

Universities and colleges in Nagpur
Engineering colleges in Nagpur
2008 establishments in Maharashtra